Abdullah Al-Mohammed ( (born 12 March 1992) is a Saudi football player who plays as a midfielder for Al-Safa.

References

External links

Living people
1992 births
Saudi Arabian footballers
Association football defenders
Al-Ahli Saudi FC players
Al-Faisaly FC players
Khaleej FC players
Al-Kawkab FC players
Al-Tai FC players
Ohod Club players
Al-Diriyah Club players
Bisha FC players
Jeddah Club players
Tuwaiq Club players
Al Safa FC players
Sportspeople from Jeddah
Saudi First Division League players
Saudi Professional League players
Saudi Second Division players